Epic Comics (also known as the Epic Comics Group) was an imprint of Marvel Comics from 1982 to 1996. A spin-off of the publisher's Epic Illustrated magazine, it published creator-owned work unconnected to Marvel's superhero universe, and without the restrictions of the Comics Code. The name was revived by Marvel in the mid-2000s for a short-lived program inviting new writers to pitch series proposals to the publisher.

History

Origins
Launched by editor-in-chief Jim Shooter as a spin-off of the successful Epic Illustrated magazine, the Epic imprint allowed creators to retain control and ownership of their properties. Co-edited by Al Milgrom and Archie Goodwin, the imprint also allowed Marvel to publish more objectionable content (sometimes explicit) without needing to comply with the stringent Comics Code Authority. Epic titles were printed on higher quality paper than typical Marvel comics, and were only available via the direct market.

Titles

 Alien Legion by writers Carl Potts and Alan Zelenetz and artist Frank Cirocco
 The Black Dragon by writer Chris Claremont and artist John Bolton 
 The Bozz Chronicles by writer David Michelinie and artists Bret Blevins and John Ridgway, moved to Dover Publications in 2015
 Cadillacs and Dinosaurs (colorized version) by writer-artist Mark Schultz
 Captain Confederacy (second series) by writer Will Shetterly and artist Vince Stone
 Coyote by writer Steve Englehart and artist Marshall Rogers, moved to Image Comics in 2005
 Crash Ryan by writer-artist Ron Harris
 Dreadstar by writer-artist Jim Starlin
 Clive Barker's Hellraiser by various writers and artists, moved to Boom! Studios in 2011
 Clive Barker's Night Breed by writers Alan Grant and John Wagner and artist Jim Baikie
 Clive Barker's The Harrowers by writers McNally Sagal, Malcolm Smith, Anna Miller and Fred Vicarel and artist Gene Colan
 Pinhead by writers D.G. Chichester and Erik Saltzgaber and artists Dario Corrasco and Phil Gascoine
 Elfquest by writer-artists Wendy and Richard Pini
 Elektra Lives Again by writer-artist Frank Miller and colorist Lynn Varley
 Fritz Leiber's Fafhrd and the Gray Mouser by writer Howard Chaykin and artist Mike Mignola, moved to Dark Horse Comics in 2007
 Feud by writer Mike Baron and artist Mark A. Nelson
 The Groo Chronicles by writer-artist Sergio Aragonés and writer Mark Evanier 
 Havok & Wolverine: Meltdown by writers Walt and Louise Simonson and artists Kent Williams and Jon J. Muth
 Interface by writer James D. Hudnall and various artists
 Iron Man: Crash by writer-artist Mike Saenz
 Lawdog by writer Chuck Dixon and artists Flint Henry, 
 The Light and Darkness War by writer Tom Veitch and artist Cam Kennedy, moved to Titan Books in 2015
 Marshal Law by writer Pat Mills and artist Kevin O'Neill, moved to DC Comics in 2013
 Midnight Men by writer-artist Howard Chaykin
 Metropol by writer-artist Ted McKeever
 Moonshadow by writer J. M. DeMatteis and artists Jon J. Muth, Kent Williams and George Pratt, moved to Dark Horse Comics in 2019
 The One by writer-artist Rick Veitch, moved to King Hell Press in 2003,
 Psychonauts by writers Alan Grant and Tony Luke and artist Motofumi Kobayashi
 Sachs and Violens by writer Peter David and writer-artist George Pérez, moved to DC Comics in 2006
 Shadowline Saga by creator Archie Goodwin
 Six From Sirius by writer by Doug Moench and artist Paul Gulacy
 The Sleeze Brothers by writer John Carnell and artist Andy Lanning
 Spyke by writer Mike Baron and artist Bill Reinhold
 Stray Toasters by writer-artist Bill Sienkiewicz
 Swords of the Swashbucklers by writer Bill Mantlo and artists Jackson Guice, Geof Isherwood and Colleen Doran
 Timespirits by writer Stephen Perry and artist Tom Yeates
 Void Indigo by writer Steve Gerber and artist Val Mayerik
 Wild Cards by various writers and artists

Source:

See also

Citations

General and cited references 

 
 
 "Epic Comics" at the International Catalogue of Superheroes

External links
 "Marvel to tell 'Epic' stories once again", Comic Book Resources
 "The Trouble with Marvel", The Comics Journal
 "Epic publishing timeline", Maelmill.com

 
1982 in comics
Publishers of adult comics